Oyster Bay is the terminus on the Oyster Bay Branch of the Long Island Rail Road. The station is located off Shore Avenue between Maxwell and Larabee Avenues. It is a sheltered concrete elevated platform that stands in the shadows of the original station, which was accessible from the ends of Maxwell, Audrey, and Hamilton Avenues. Both stations exist along the south side of Roosevelt Park.

The original Oyster Bay station opened on June 24, 1889 and remodeled in 1902. At one point there were plans to extend the line east towards the Port Jefferson Branch. There was also a large pier built to facilitate the loading of passenger cars onto a short-lived ferry to Wilson's Point in South Norwalk, Connecticut that is now owned by the Flowers Oyster Company. The former Oyster Bay Station and the Oyster Bay Long Island Rail Road Turntable were both listed separately on the National Register of Historic Places on July 6, 2005. Efforts are under way to transform the former station into a railroad museum.

No bus access is available for the station, however local taxicabs do stop.

Platform and track configuration
This station has one high-level side platform, four cars long, located adjacent to the south track. The north track, not adjacent to the platform, is a passing siding, which rejoins the south track and leads to a seven-track yard just beyond the station. The old station building lies just east of the new station. The Theodore Roosevelt Memorial Park is just to the north of the siding track.

History

On June 24, 1889, the Oyster Bay Extension Railroad, a subsidiary of the Long Island Railroad, extended the terminus of its rail line from Locust Valley to Oyster Bay and constructed this beautiful Victorian train station on land donated by Col. Robert Townsend. Service began with eight round trips operating from Long Island City. The original station had a large wooden platform and an elegant porte cochere, a covered porch large enough for horse-drawn carriages to pass through.

In 1891, the Long Island Rail Road connected the land to the sea via a  wharf that enabled rail cars full of passengers to be loaded onto a ferry. This ferry, called the Cape Charles would take passengers to Connecticut where the railways would be connected to the Housatonic Railroad and continue on to Boston. This unique service from New York to Boston ceased operations when a land route across Connecticut was built.

On September 9, 1891, Locomotive No. 113 exploded while idling in the station awaiting passengers. People as far away as East Norwich felt the force of the blast; three crewmen were killed.

When Theodore Roosevelt became President of the New York City Police Board in 1895, he commuted regularly through this station, and when he became President of the United States in 1901, a huge expansion of the station was planned to accommodate the expected rise in visitors to the hamlet. Those 1902 renovations included the removal of the porte cochere and the addition of  weather sheds. Inside the station, a large fireplace and tiled hearth were added, and on the exterior a special stucco was used that contained real oyster shells.

The architect for the 1902 renovations was Bradford Lee Gilbert, who also designed the 1898 renovations to Grand Central Station.

At the end of the 20th century, the station fell into a state of disrepair. To accommodate double-decker trains, a new station and platform were built nearby.

Railroad museum
The Oyster Bay Railroad Museum, a NYS Historical/educational Not for Profit Museum is working on the Museum under the Town of Oyster Bay. The original LIRR Oyster Bay railroad station is now owned by the Town of Oyster Bay, rather than the LIRR and currently is not accessible to the public while undergoing various engineering and architectural studies and reviews in order to start the restoration into a museum.

The Oyster Bay Railroad Museum Preview Center is now open at 102 Audrey Ave. a few hundred feet from the station building near Oyster Bay Town Hall. (516-558-7036)

The Oyster Bay Railroad Museum has begun work to transform the station into the new home of the Oyster Bay Railroad Museum.

Turntable 

Oyster Bay is the location of one of few remaining Long Island Rail Road stations with an original turntable on site. The turntable was built in 1902 to replace a smaller one that had been relocated from the Locust Valley station. The turntable, which is listed on the National Register of Historic Places separately from the station, is a Town of Oyster Bay Landmark, and a featured site on the Oyster Bay History Walk audio walking tour.

See also
 Oyster Bay History Walk
 Theodore Roosevelt in Oyster Bay
 List of Town of Oyster Bay Landmarks
 National Register of Historic Places listings in Nassau County, New York

References

Morrison, David D. (2018). Long Island Rail Road - Oyster Bay Branch. Images of Rail. Charleston SC: Arcadia Publishing. ISBN 978-1-4671-2854-4

External links

Oyster Bay Station History (Arrt's Arrchives)
Oyster Bay Railroad Museum 
Moving equipment to and from Mitchell Field (Including YouTube Videos) (Unofficial LIRR History Website)
Oyster Bay Station History (Steve Lynch's LIRR Maps, Photos, Charts, etc.) (TrainsAreFun.com)
Oyster Bay Turntable (TrainsAreFun.com)
Platform and parking lot, seen from Google Maps Street View

Long Island Rail Road stations in Nassau County, New York
Railway stations in the United States opened in 1889
Town of Oyster Bay Landmark
Railway stations on the National Register of Historic Places in New York (state)
National Register of Historic Places in Oyster Bay (town), New York
Landmarks in Oyster Bay (town), New York
Museums in Nassau County, New York
Railroad museums in New York (state)
Proposed museums in the United States